The Thailand men's national field hockey team represents Thailand in international men's field hockey competitions. As of September 2019, they are ranked 40th in the world.

Current squad

Tournament history

See also
 Thailand women's national field hockey team

References

National team
Asian men's national field hockey teams
field hockey